Michael Droese (born 9 August 1952 in Ueckermünde) is a former sprinter who specialized in the 100 metres. He represented East Germany and competed for the club SC Motor Jena.

He won the bronze medal in 4 x 100 metres relay at the 1974 European Championships together with teammates Manfred Kokot, Hans-Jürgen Bombach and Siegfried Schenke.

Records

References 

1952 births
Living people
People from Ueckermünde
People from Bezirk Neubrandenburg
East German male sprinters
European Athletics Championships medalists
Sportspeople from Mecklenburg-Western Pomerania